Gaston Camara (born 31 March 1996) is a Guinean professional footballer who currently plays as a winger for Siracusa Calcio, Sicilian team of Italian championship of Eccellenza.

Club career

Internazionale 
Camara played on loan for Internazionale from August 2013 till January 2014. In January 2014 he moved permanently to Inter. He made his Serie A debut at 1 November 2014 against Parma. He replaced Gary Medel after 89 minutes in a 2-0 away defeat. He is highly rated by Inter fans as a quick, and technically capable, right winger.

Loan to Bari and Modena 
On 4 August 2015, Camara was signed on loan by Bari. However, he return to Inter in January 2016 without play any match with Bari.

On 28 January 2016, Camara was signed by Serie B side Modena on a 6-month loan deal. On 30 January he made his debut for Modena in Serie B as a substitute replacing Luca Belingheri in the 82nd minute in a 2–1 home defeat against Ternana. On 13 February he played his first and only entire match for the team, a 2–1 defeat against Virtus Lanciano. Camara ended his 6-month loan to Modena with 10 appearances, but only 1 as a stater.

Loan to Brescia 
On 4 August 2016, Camara was signed by Serie B club  Brescia on a season-long loan with option to buy. Three days later, on 7 August, he made his debut for the club the second round of the Coppa Italia replacing Andrej Modic in the 65th minute of a 2–0 loss against Pisa. On 27 August he made his Serie B debut for Brescia as a substitute replacining Federico Bonazzoli in the 82nd minute in a 1–1 away draw against Avellino. On 26 November he played his first match as a starter, a 1–0 home win over Ascoli, he was replaced by Federico Bonazzoli after 71 minutes. On 24 February 2017, Camara played his first entire match for the team, a 4–1 home win over Cittadella. On 21 June Brescia excised the option to buy the player. However, Internazionale also excised the counter-option on the next day.

Loan to Gil Vicente 
On 2 August 2017, Camara was signed by LigaPro club Gil Vicente on a season-long loan. On 13 August he made he made his debut in for the club as a substitute replacing James Igbekeme in the 76th minute in a 2–1 home defeat against Cova de Piedade. On 30 September he played his first entire match for Gil Vicente, a 3–0 home win over Vitória Guimarães II. On 18 March 2018, Camara scored his first professional goal in the 26th minute of a 2-1 away win over Benfica II. Camara ended his season-long loan to Gil Vicente with 31 appearances, 1 goal and 4 assists.

Leixões
On 31 January 2019, Camara signed with Leixões for the rest of the season.

Sammaurese Calcio
In August 2019, Camara returned to Italy and joined Serie D club Sammaurese Calcio.

Career statistics

Club

Honours

Club 
Inter Primavera

 Torneo di Viareggio: 2015

References

Living people
1996 births
Guinean footballers
Guinean expatriate footballers
Inter Milan players
S.S.C. Bari players
Modena F.C. players
Brescia Calcio players
Gil Vicente F.C. players
Leixões S.C. players
Serie A players
Serie B players
Serie D players
Liga Portugal 2 players
Guinean expatriate sportspeople in Italy
Guinean expatriate sportspeople in Portugal
Expatriate footballers in Italy
Expatriate footballers in Portugal
Association football wingers